Anna Schudt (born 23 March 1974) is a German Emmy-winning actress. She is internationally best known for playing comedian Gaby Köster in the television film Ein Schnupfen hätte auch gereicht.

References

External links
 

International Emmy Award for Best Actress winners
German television actresses
German film actresses
German stage actresses
21st-century German actresses
20th-century German actresses
1974 births
People from Konstanz
Living people